Crack-Up is a 1936 American film directed by Malcolm St. Clair. Peter Lorre plays a harmless, half-addled aircraft enthusiast who is actually a ruthless spy desperate to get his hands on the blueprints for an experimental aircraft. He faces off against Ace Martin, played by Brian Donlevy, the pilot of the aircraft, whose motives are spurred by feeling cheated by his own company. The supporting cast includes Helen Wood, Ralph Morgan and Thomas Beck.

Plot

At the christening of the "Wild Goose," an experimental aircraft designed for transatlantic flights, a number of significant industry figures from the Fleming-Grant Airways Corporation are present. President John R. Fleming (Ralph Morgan) introduces the test pilots, Ace Martin (Brian Donlevy) and Joe Randall (Thomas Beck), along with Joe's fiancée, Ruth Franklin (Helen Wood). The eccentric Colonel Gimpy (Peter Lorre) convinces company people that he loves aviation and joins the group. He is really Baron Rudolph Maximilian Tagger, the head of a foreign spy ring, who plans to steal plans for the company's new secret "D.O.X." bomber design.

Gimpy seeks out a disgruntled Ace Martin and offers him money to betray his employer. Ace uses Joe, his young protégé, to obtain the plans, telling him he had made the blueprints. The Baron's Operative #77 (J. Carrol Naish), secretly working for another spy organization, attempts to get the plans, offering Ace three times more money. The meeting between the two is watched by the baron, forcing Ace to kill the spy and keep the plans to bargain directly with the baron.

On the maiden flight of the "Wild Goose", Ace and Joe are flying to Berlin with the company president on board. When they are in the air, Colonel Gimpy reveals that he has stowed away to accompany them. A gas cap comes loose, jeopardizing the flight. Ace volunteers to climb out onto the wing and secure the gas cap.

At the War Department, officials tell Ruth that Joe has been unwittingly drawn into a spy operation. She radios the aircraft, now far off course over the Atlantic Ocean, convincing Joe to turn Ace in. Reacting angrily, he tries to shake Ace off the wing, but is restrained by the others. When Ace returns, a struggle over the controls leads to a burst of steam spraying over Ace's face, blinding him and the aircraft being forced to ditch in the ocean.

With death imminent, as water fills the cabin, Ace shoots the baron and gives Joe the only life jacket, along with the bomber blueprints, so that he will be rescued by a nearby steamer. The three doomed men left on board smoke a last cigarette as the "Wild Goose" sinks.

Cast

 Peter Lorre as Colonel Gimpy (aka "The Chief", Baron Rudolph Maximilian Tagger)
 Brian Donlevy as Ace Martin
 Helen Wood as Ruth Franklin
 Ralph Morgan as John R. Fleming
 Thomas Beck as Joe Randall
 Kay Linaker as Mrs. Fleming
 Lester Matthews as Sidney Grant
 Earle Foxe as Operative #30
 J. Carrol Naish as Operative #77
 Gloria Roy as Operative #16
 Oscar Apfel as Alfred Knuxton
 Paul Stanton as Daniel D. Harrington
 Howard C. Hickman as Major White

Production
Principal photography for Crack-Up took place from late September to late October 1936, primarily at the 20th Century Fox studios. A Lockheed Electra, from the nearby Lockheed Aircraft plant, stood in for the experimental "Wild Goose" research aircraft.

Reception
Crack-Up was a low-budget B movie that was enhanced by the sinister presence of Lorre who "... plays his limited role with a refreshing sense of sardonic humor." Leonard Maltin's review opined, "Not-bad espionage tale, with Lorre highly amusing as a spy trying to secure plans for experimental airplane; Donlevy's the test pilot he tries to bribe." On the DVD release of Crack-Up, the reviewer for DVD Talk gave a positive recommendation: "A lot of 'Crack-Up' doesn't make a lick of real-world sense, but in its own crazy way, the film is quite entertaining."

See also
 Norman Cyril Jackson, who was awarded the Victoria Cross for climbing out on the wing of an Avro Lancaster bomber to try to put out a fire during a Second World War bombing mission.

References

Notes

Citations

Bibliography

 Wynne, H. Hugh. The Motion Picture Stunt Pilots and Hollywood's Classic Aviation Movies. Missoula, Montana: Pictorial Histories Publishing Co., 1987. .

External links
 
 

1936 films
1930s spy drama films
American spy drama films
American aviation films
American black-and-white films
Films directed by Malcolm St. Clair
20th Century Fox films
1936 drama films
1930s English-language films
1930s American films